Fuerteventura Airport , also known as El Matorral Airport, is an airport serving the Spanish island of Fuerteventura. The airport has flight connections to over 80 destinations worldwide, and over 5.6 million passengers passed through it in 2016.

The airport has one terminal building with two floors. The ground floor has two sections; one section is for flight arrivals and the other for flight departures. The first floor has the departures lounge and 24 boarding gates. In total, the terminal covers over 92,000 m2 and it has the capacity to handle 8.2 million passengers per year.

History

Early years
The airport was opened officially on 14 September 1969. The first plane to touch down on the new runway was an Iberia Fokker F27, which flew the route Gran Canaria-Fuerteventura-Lanzarote.

In 1973, El Matorral Airport began to operate its first flights to European countries with the airline Condor, which linked the German city of Düsseldorf directly with Puerto del Rosario. In the following years, the airport experienced considerable growth in the number of operations, which resulted in a series of improvements, starting in 1978, to ensure that the working of the aerodrome continued to meet the needs of the passengers.

Development since the 1990s

In 1994, construction started on a new terminal building, an aircraft apron, a taxiway parallel to the runway, a power plant and a new access road. The works were completed with the extension of the car park and a detour on the Puerto de Rosario-Matorral, road adding some two kilometres, of which 1.5 are double lane. With the new facilities it was possible to attend around five million passengers a year and manage around 3,100 passengers per hour during rush-hour periods.

Airlines and destinations

The following airlines operate regular scheduled and charter flights at Fuerteventura Airport:

Statistics

References

External links

Official website

Airports in the Canary Islands
Buildings and structures in Fuerteventura
Airports established in 1969